Chang Phueak is a tambon (subdistrict) of Mueang Chiang Mai District, in Chiang Mai Province, Thailand. In 2010 it had a population of 9,191 people. The tambon contains five villages, including Khun Chang Khian and others.

References

Tambon of Chiang Mai province
Populated places in Chiang Mai province